The Lukens Pierce House, also known as the Fallowfield Octagonal House. is an historic octagon house which is located northwest of Ercildoun on Wilmington Road in East Fallowfield Township, Chester County, Pennsylvania. 

It was added to the National Register of Historic Places on March 14, 1973.

History and architectural features
This building was constructed of stuccoed fieldstone and has a cupola. There are four large rectangular rooms and four smaller triangular rooms on each floor.

On March 14, 1973, it was added to the National Register of Historic Places.

References

External links
Historic American Buildings Survey Lukens Pierce House, Wilmington Road (East Fallowfield Township), includes 2 photos, and supplemental data.
115 Wilmington Road, East Fallowfield, PA 19320, realtor's video, 5:31

Houses completed in 1856
Houses on the National Register of Historic Places in Pennsylvania
Octagon houses in the United States
Houses in Chester County, Pennsylvania
National Register of Historic Places in Chester County, Pennsylvania